James Koko Lomell (born 16 October 1985 in Monrovia) is a Liberian former footballer.

Club career 
In Summer 2008 was on trial with team in Europe Ankaraspor but his management refused the offered contract. Lomell played for PSMS Medan and Pelita Jaya in Indonesia.

In January 2015, he was reported to have signed with Persiram.

International career 
He is also a member of the Liberia national football team.

Honours 
LPRC Oilers
Winner
 Liberian Premier League: 2005

LISCR FC
Winner
 Liberian Premier League: 2010−11

References

External links 
 

1985 births
Living people
Liberian footballers
Liberia international footballers
Association football midfielders
Hapoel Petah Tikva F.C. players
Expatriate footballers in Israel
Expatriate footballers in Indonesia
PSMS Medan players
Sportspeople from Monrovia
Liga 1 (Indonesia) players
Deltras F.C. players
Liberian expatriates in Indonesia
Pelita Bandung Raya players
PS Barito Putera players
Manning Rangers F.C. players
Junior Professional FC players
F.C. AK players